The Original Ballet Russe (originally named Ballets Russes de Monte-Carlo) was a ballet company established in 1931 by René Blum and Colonel Wassily de Basil as a successor to the Ballets Russes, founded in 1909 by Sergei Diaghilev. The company assumed the new name Original Ballet Russe after a split between de Basil and Blum. De Basil led the renamed company, while Blum and others founded a new company under the name Ballet Russe de Monte-Carlo. It was a large scale professional ballet company which toured extensively in Europe, Australia and New Zealand, the United States, and Central and South America. It closed down operations in 1947.

History

Dissolution of Ballets Russes and formation of Ballets Russes de Monte-Carlo 
The company's name is derived from the Ballets Russes of impresario Sergei Diaghilev. The last season of Diaghilev's Ballets Russes was 1929, during which it toured and performed in both London, England, and Paris, France. During the final season, it produced the new ballets The Prodigal Son and Le Bal. The company performed for the final time in London at the Covent Garden Theatre on July 26, 1929. Diaghliev died of complications from diabetes a month later, on August 19, 1929.

In 1931, with the help from financier Serge Denham, René Blum and Colonel Wassily de Basil formed Les Ballets Russes de Monte-Carlo. One of the new company's board members was American businessman Jim Thompson.

Massine and Balanchine join 
The company hired Leonide Massine and George Balanchine as choreographers. The majority of the works performed had previously been staged by Diaghilev's company, but other new works were commissioned, such as Jeux d'enfants, with music by Georges Bizet and sets by Joan Miró. Featured dancers included David Lichine (who soon began choreographing ballets for the company), and the "baby ballerinas" Irina Baronova, Tamara Toumanova, and Tatiana Riabouchinska. The company conductor was Efrem Kurtz, who stayed until 1942, touring with them extensively, and the librettist was Boris Kochno. The company gave its first performance in Monte Carlo in 1932.

Without consulting Blum, Col. de Basil dropped Balanchine after one year – ostensibly because he thought that audiences preferred the works choreographed by Massine. Librettist Kochno was also let go, while dancer Toumanova left the company when Balanchine was fired. According to historian Katherine Sorley-Walker, however, Balanchine and Kochno left of their own volition, because they found Blum and De Basil "dictatorial."

Blum leaves, Nijinska joins 
Col. de Basil and Blum had an acrimonious relationship, which ended in 1934 with Blum breaking up the partnership. Col. de Basil renamed his company Ballets Russes de Colonel W. de Basil. In April, 1934, Bronislava Nijinska directed the company's season at the Théâtre de Monte-Carlo, presenting her ballets Bolero, Variations, Etude, and Les Comediens Jaloux. Nijinska created Les Cent Baisers for the company's London season in 1935.

The company struggled financially in the wake of the Great Depression, and was on the verge of bankruptcy. Sol Hurok, an American, took over the management of the Ballet Russe and brought the company to the United States.

The company splits 
In 1937, Massine left, joining with Blum to form their own company, recruiting several dancers from their previous group. However, the ballets which Massine had choreographed while under contract with Col. de Basil were owned by his company. Massine sued de Basil in London to regain the intellectual property rights to his own works. He also sued to claim the Ballet Russe de Monte-Carlo name. The jury decided that de Basil owned Massine's ballets created between 1932 and 1937, but not those created before 1932. It also ruled that both successor companies could use the name Ballet Russe – but only Massine and Blum's company could be called Ballet Russe de Monte-Carlo. Col. de Basil renamed his company again, calling it the Covent Garden Russian Ballet and bringing on Michel Fokine as resident choreographer.

Sol Hurok ended up managing Blum and Massine's company as well. The Ballet Russe de Monte-Carlo and the Original Ballet Russe often performed near each other. Under its new name, the company's first season, starting May 1938, was at the Royal Opera House, Covent Garden. Massine's Ballet Russe de Monte-Carlo had a season at the Theatre Royal, Drury Lane a few hundred yards away, and this season was known as the "London Ballet Wars".

After London, Hurok booked both of the companies to perform in New York (with de Basil's company playing the Hollywood Theatre), for a total of fifteen weeks, making it the longest ballet season of New York. Along with management, the two companies also shared dancers. Hurok continued to have the companies perform near each other; he hoped to reunite the companies, but ultimately was unsuccessful. The company then spent some weeks on a "whistle stop" tour of America, sleeping on the special train hired to transport them.

In 1939, the company spent a six-week season at Covent Garden. English ballerina Mona Inglesby danced with the company that season.

Finally, in 1939, Col. de Basil gave the company its final name, the Original Ballet Russe.

The company toured extensively throughout Europe and Australia, visiting Australia in 1936–37, 1938–39, and 1939–40. During his visit to Australia, de Basil commissioned work from Australians, especially from designers, who included Sidney Nolan and Kathleen and Florence Martin. He also instigated a design competition for an original Australian ballet, which was won by Donald Friend with designs for a ballet based on a fictitious event in the life of Ned Kelly.. A number of dancers stayed in Australia, including Kira Bousloff, who went on to found the West Australian Ballet.

During World War II 
Soon after they returned to the United States in 1939, World War II broke out. The company suffered financially, but was able to book an entire cast of dancers on tour to Havana, Cuba, in 1941. Alberto Alonso and his first wife Patricia Denise danced all the principal roles on the Havana tour. The company could not pay the dancers adequately, and some took second jobs in nightclubs to survive. Principal dancers were forced to take roles that were not solos.

While in Cuba, David Lichine and Tatiana Leskova appeared in Conga Pantera at the Cabaret Tropicana. Other dancers included Tamara Grigorieva, Nina Verchinina, Anna Leontieva, Genevieve Moulin, Tatiana Leskova, Anna Volkova, Your Lazowski, Dimitri Romanoff, Roman Jasinski, Paul Petroff, and Oleg Tupin.

Disbandment 
In 1947, the Original Ballet Russe gave its last season in London before disbanding. The company was revived in 1951 by family members G. Kirsta and the Grigorievs, after Col. de Basil died. The company proved to be financially unstable, and folded while on tour in Europe in 1952.

In popular culture 
A feature documentary about the company, featuring interviews with many of the dancers, was released in 2005, with the title Ballets Russes.

A Thousand Encores: Ballets Russes in Australia was a documentary screened on ABC Television on November 3, 2009, about the company's three visits to Australia between 1936 and 1940.  The documentary claims that there is more footage of the Ballets Russes in Australia than anywhere else in the world.  Some film was in colour, a rarity for that time.

Works 
 1932
George Balanchine's Cotillion, Le Bourgeois Gentilhomme, La Concurrence, and Suites de Danses
 Léonide Massine's Jeux d'enfants
Boris Romanoff's Chout (Le Bouffon) Pulcinella, and L'Amour Sorcier
Lev Ivanov's Le Lac des Cygnes (Swan Lake), act II
Michel Fokine's Petrouchka, Les Sylphides, and The Polovtsian Dances from Prince Igor
 1933
David Lichine's Nocturne (set to the music of Rameau)
 Léonide Massine's Les Présages (set to Tchaikovsky's Symphony No. 5), Le Beau Danube, Beach, Scuola di Ballo, and Les Matelots
 14 September — Michel Fokine's Carnaval (set to Robert Schumann's Carnaval, Op. 9), London, UK
 24 October premiere — Leonide Massine's Choreartium (set to Brahm's Fourth Symphony), Alhambra Theatre, London, UK
Vaslav Nijinsky's L'Après-midi d'un faune
 1934
Léonide Massine's  Le Tricorne, Chicago
 Léonide Massine's Union Pacific, Philadelphia
 Léonide Massine's La Boutique Fantasque
 Léonide Massine's Les Contes Russes
David Lichine's Les Imaginaires
Bronislava Nijinska's Bolero
 Bronislava Nijinska's Variations
 Bronislava Nijinska's Étude
 Bronislava Nijinska's Les Comediens Jaloux
Marius Petipa's Le Marriage d'Aurore (arranged by Nijinska)
Michel Fokine's L'Oiseau de feu
 1935
Léonide Massine's Jardin public, Chicago
 Léonide Massine's Le Bal, Chicago
 Léonide Massine's Union Pacific
 Léonide Massine's Les femmes de bonne humeur
 Léonide Massine's Le Soleil de Nuit
Bronislava Nijinska's Les Cent Baisers
Michel Fokine's Schéhérazade, Thamar, and Le Spectre de la Rose
 1936
David Lichine's Le Pavillon, 24 July premiere 
Léonide Massine's Symphonie Fantastique (set to Hector Berlioz' symphony), Covent Garden, London, UK, 13 October
 Léonide Massine's La Boutique fantasque, Theatre Royal, Adelaide, Australia
 Leon Woizikovsky's L'Amour Sorcier
 Léonide Massine's Cimarosiana
Michel Fokine's Cléopâtre and Papillons
Bronislava Nijinska's Danses slaves et tziganes and Les Noces

 1936–1937 Australia tour
Marius Petipa's Aurora's Wedding
 Léonide Massine's Le Beau Danube
 Léonide Massine's La Boutique Fantasque
 Michel Fokine's Carnaval
 Léonide Massine's Les Contes Russes
 George Balanchine's Cotillon
 Michel Fokine's L'Oiseau de Feu
 Bronislava Nijinska's Les Cent Baisers
 Leon Woitzikowsky's L'Amour Sorcier
 Vaslav Nijinsky's L'Après-midi d'un faune
 Léonide Massine's Le Soleil de Nuit
 Michel Fokine's Petrouchka
 Leon Woitzikowsky's Port Said
 Léonide Massine's Les Presages
 Michel Fokine's Prince Igor
 Michel Fokine's Schéhérazade
 Léonide Massine's Scuola di Ballo
 Michel Fokine's Le Spectre de la Rose
 Lev Ivanov's Swan Lake, Act II
 Michel Fokine's Les Sylphides
 Michel Fokine's Thamar
 1937
 11 January — Michel Fokine's Petrouchka, Sydney
 Michel Fokine's Le Coq d'or (set to the music of Nikolai Rimsky-Korsakov)
 David Lichine's Francesca da Rimini,  Le Lion amoureux, and Les Dieux mendiants
 1938 
 Michel Fokine's Cendrillon
 David Lichine's Le Fils Prodigue and Protée
 1939
 Michel Fokine's Paganini
1940
 Serge Lifar's Le Danube bleu
1940 Australia tour
David Lichine's Graduation Ball (set to the music of Johann Strauss II), Melbourne
Igor Schwezoff's La Lutte eternelle, Sydney
Mikhail Obukhov (after Petipa, Saint-Leon)'s Coppélia, Sydney
Nina Verchinina's Etude (The Quest)
 Serge Lifar's Icare and Pavane (Las Meninas)
1941 Havana tour
Michael Fokine's Les Sylphides, Le Coq d'or, Paganini, Prince Igor, Carnaval, Petrushka, Sheherazade, and Le Spectre de la Rose
Léonide Massine's Symphonie Fantastique, Les Présages, and Le Beau Danube
Marius Petipa's Le Marriage d’Aurore 
George Balanchine's Cotillon and Balustrade
Bronislava Nijinska's Les Cent Baisers
1942
Vania Psota and S. Pueyrredón de Elizalde's Fue una vez
1943
 Vania Psota's El Malón
1944
 Vania Psota's La isla de los ceibos
1945
Vania Psota's Yx-kik
1946
spring — David Lichine's Cain and Abel, Mexico City
John Taras' Camille
William Dollar's Constantia
Anton Dolin's Giselle (after Coralli) and Pas de Quatre
Antonia Cobos' Mute Wife
Edward Caton's Sebastian
Vania Psota's Yara
 1947
Jerome Robbins' Pas de Trois
Bronislava Nijinska's Pictures at an Exhibition
spring — Giselle, Metropolitan Opera House, New York
 spring — Swan Lake, Metropolitan Opera House, New York
Boris Kniasev's Piccoli and The Silver Birch
 summer — David Lichine's Graduation Ball, London, UK
1948
Anatole Joukovsky's Danzas eslavas
Nina Verchinina's Suite choréographique
Nina Verchinina's Valse triste

References

Notes

Sources consulted 
 
 Sorley Walker, Kathrine. 1982. De Basil's Ballets Russes. London: Hutchinson. ; New York: Atheneum. .

Further reading 

Chazin-Bennahum, Judith (2011) René Blum and the Ballets Russes: In search of a lost life. New York: Oxford University Press. 
Sorley-Walker, Katherine (1983) De Basil's Ballets Russes. New York: Atheneum.  
Detaille, Georges and Mulys, Gérard (1954) Les Ballets de Monte-Carlo 1911-1944. Paris: Arc-en-Ciel.
Haskell, Arnold L. (1937) Dancing Round the World. London: Victor Gollancz Ltd.
Hall, Hugh P. (1948) Ballet in Australia from Pavlova to Rambert. Melbourne: Georgian House.

Ballets Russes and descendants
Ballet companies